Everything is a file is an idea that Unix, and its derivatives, handle input/output to and from resources such as documents, hard-drives, modems, keyboards, printers and even some inter-process and network communications as simple streams of bytes exposed through the filesystem name space. Exceptions include shared memory, semaphores, datagram sockets, symbolic links, directories (which are read-only, and are not accessed as a byte-stream), processes and threads.

The advantage of this approach is that the same set of tools, utilities and APIs can be used on a wide range of resources and a number of file types. When a file is opened, a file descriptor is created, using the file path as an addressing system. The file descriptor is then a byte stream I/O interface on which file operations are performed. Additionally, file descriptors are also created for objects such as anonymous pipes and network sockets - and therefore a more accurate description of this feature is Everything is a file descriptor.

Additionally, a range of pseudo and virtual filesystems exists which exposes information about processes and other system information in a hierarchical file-like structure. These are mounted into the single file hierarchy.

An example of this purely virtual filesystem is under /proc that exposes many system properties as files.  All of these files, in the broader sense of the word, have standard Unix file attributes such as an owner and access permissions, and can be queried by the same classic Unix tools and filters.  However, this is not universally considered a fast or portable approach. Some operating systems do not even mount /proc by default due to security or speed concerns.  It is, though, used heavily by both the widely installed BusyBox on embedded systems and by procps, which is used on most Linux systems. In both cases it is used in implementations of process-related POSIX shell commands. It is similarly used on Android systems in the operating system's Toolbox program.

See also
 
 Device file
 Synthetic file system
 Unix architecture

References

Information theory
Unix file system technology